Katzir is a surname. Notable people with the surname include:

Abraham Katzir (born 1941), Israeli physicist
Aharon Katzir (1914–1972), Israeli biophysicist
Ephraim Katzir (1916–2009), Israeli biophysicist, politician and President of Israel
Mor Katzir (born 1980), Israeli model
Nina Katzir, wife of the President of the State of Israel, Ephraim Katzir, and an English teacher

See also
Katzir (disambiguation)